André Bedoglouyan (February 18, 1920 – April 13, 2010) was a Lebanese-Armenian hierarch of the Armenian Catholic Church.

Bedoglouyan was born in Zahlé, Lebanon and was ordained a priest on December 25, 1945, from the religious order Institut du Clergé Patriarcal de Bzommar. He was appointed Auxiliary Bishop of Patriarch Catholicos of Cilicia on July 24, 1971, as well as titular bishop of Comana Armeniae, and was ordained a bishop on September 19, 1971. Bedoglouyan retired as auxiliary bishop on November 5, 1994. Bedoglouyan died on April 13, 2010.

See also
Holy See of Cilicia

External links
Catholic-Hierarchy

20th-century Eastern Catholic bishops
21st-century Eastern Catholic bishops
1920 births
2010 deaths
Members of the Patriarchal Congregation of Bzommar
Lebanese clergy
People from Zahle